In Greek mythology Poliporthes (also known as Ptoliporthes or Ptoliporthus) was the son born to Odysseus and Penelope after his return from the Trojan War. He was so named ("destroyer of cities") because his father had sacked the city of Troy (cf., e.g., Od.8.3). 

Alternatively, he was the son of Telemachus and Nausicaa and Odysseus gave him this name.

References

Children of Odysseus